Particle accelerators in popular culture appear in popular science books, fictional literature, feature films, TV series and other media which include particle accelerators as part of their content. Particle physics, fictional or scientific, is an inherent part of this topic.

In popular science

The God Particle

The God Particle: If the Universe Is the Answer, What Is the Question? is a 1993 popular science book by Nobel Prize-winning physicist Leon M. Lederman and science writer Dick Teresi. This book was very popular, a New York Times, bestseller, which introduced the public to an overview of the science of Particle physics.

It provides a brief history of particle physics, starting with the Pre-Socratic Greek philosopher Democritus, and continuing through Isaac Newton, Roger J. Boscovich, Michael Faraday, and Ernest Rutherford. This leads into a discussion of the development of quantum physics in the 20th century. In a nod to the philosophy of atomism, Lederman follows the convention of using the word "atom" to refer to atoms in their modern sense as the smallest unit of any chemical element, and "a-tom" to refer to the actual basic indivisible particles of matter, the quarks and leptons.

Richard Feynman books

Surely You're Joking, Mr. Feynman!
Surely You're Joking, Mr. Feynman! is an edited collection of reminiscences by the Nobel Prize-winning physicist Richard Feynman.  The book, released in 1985, covers a variety of instances in Feynman's life. Some are lighthearted in tone, such as his fascination with safe-cracking, fondness for topless bars, and ventures into art and samba music. Others cover more serious material, including his work on the Manhattan Project (during which his first wife Arline Greenbaum died of tuberculosis) and his critique of the science education system in Brazil.

The Feynman Lectures on Physics
The Feynman Lectures on Physics is a 1964 physics textbook by Richard Feynman, Robert B. Leighton and Matthew Sands, based upon the lectures given by Feynman to undergraduate students at the California Institute of Technology (Caltech) in 1961–63. It includes lectures on mathematics, electromagnetism, Newtonian physics, quantum physics, and even the relation of physics to other sciences. Six readily accessible chapters were later compiled into a book entitled Six Easy Pieces: Essentials of Physics Explained by Its Most Brilliant Teacher, and six more in Six Not So Easy Pieces: Einstein's Relativity, Symmetry and Space-Time.

The first volume focuses on mechanics, radiation, and heat. The second volume is mainly on electromagnetism and matter. The third volume, on quantum mechanics, shows, for example, how the double-slit experiment contains the essential features of quantum mechanics.

Large Hadron Collider
The Large Hadron Collider has created a niche in popular culture. From real science, which includes the mystery of the Higgs particle, to justifications for the cost, and to a thwarted cyber attack, the LHC has received a lot of press.
It has also been the inspiration for popular fictional works. See fictional sections below.

In fictional literature

Angels & Demons
The novel Angels & Demons, by Dan Brown, involves antimatter created at the LHC to be used in a weapon against the Vatican.

Firstborn
In the novel Firstborn, by Arthur C. Clarke. the alephtron is described as a particle accelerator wrapping around the lunar equator.

Flashforward
The novel FlashForward, by Robert J. Sawyer, involves the search for the Higgs boson at the LHC. CERN published a "Science and Fiction" page interviewing Sawyer and physicists about the book and the TV series based on it.

Timescape
Timescape is a 1980 novel by Gregory Benford (with unbilled co-author Hilary Foister). It won the 1980 Nebula and British Science Fiction Awards, This novel involves using time travel to avert ecological disasters.

Cosm
In Cosm by Gregory Benford, a quark–gluon plasma is created in a particle accelerator. It becomes a separate universe which evolves from its big-bang to its end in a brief period.

Black Hole
By Angelo Paratico, published in Italy by Mursia in 2007. A group of physicists try to stop the LHC but fail and a micro black hole is formed. It gradually swallows our planet.

In feature films

Ghostbusters and Ghostbusters 2
The Ghostbusters proton packs are also called particle throwers or unlicensed particle accelerators.  Particle acceleration is used to lasso the ghosts for easy entrapment.

Iron Man 2
The Iron Man 2 features a makeshift particle accelerator used by Tony Stark to create a new chemical element, more biologically inert than the palladium used in the arc reactor.

Angels & Demons
The movie version of the book has footage filmed on-site at one of the experiments at the LHC; the director, Ron Howard, met with CERN experts in an effort to make the science in the story more accurate.

Terminator 3: Rise of the Machines
Terminator 3: Rise of the Machines features a particle accelerator that traps the metallic T-X Terminatrix in its powerful electromagnetic field, buying time for the protagonists to get a head start in their escape.

In TV series

FlashForward
FlashForward was an American science-fiction television series which aired for one season on ABC. It was loosely based on the 1999 novel Flashforward by Canadian science fiction writer Robert J. Sawyer.  It ran from September 24, 2009, through May 27, 2010.

The Adventures of the Galaxy Rangers
The Adventures of the Galaxy Rangers episode "Trouble at Texton" featured a particle accelerator on the moon Texton, operated by a mad scientist determined to prove the existence of parallel universes.

The Sparticle Mystery
A particle accelerator is the cause of the adults disappearing in the CBBC science fiction drama, The Sparticle Mystery.

Terra Nova
In Terra Nova the rift in spacetime that allows time travel is a natural phenomenon discovered by scientists working at Fermilab. Hope Plaza, the facility holding the time portal has two large semicircles in its structure, presumably the accelerator itself.

The Flash (2014 TV series)
In the 2014 TV series The Flash, a scientist by the name of Harrison Wells (portrayed by Tom Cavanagh) creates a particle accelerator in the year 2020, which is not successful and creates metahumans (humans with supernatural powers), including Barry Allen / The Flash. However, in the year 2024, the Flash is forced to time travel as he sees that the man in the yellow suit (the Flash's main villain) will travel as well to the year 2000, to kill the Flash as a child. The man in yellow (whose name is Eobard Thawne) fails to kill the younger Barry and angered, kills his mother; he later finds out that he can't go back to his time due to fighting the Flash. He finds Dr. Wells at a beach and sets a trap for him when Wells and his wife pass by Starling City, killing Wells' wife but with Dr. Wells still surviving. Thawne uses a device to steal Well's identity (which kills him as well) and quickly constructs the building of S.T.A.R. Labs (which Wells built way later in his time). He also builds the particle accelerator quickly as well (Wells built it in 2020) because he wants to confront the Flash sooner, gain his speed, and travel back to his time. The particle accelerator once again is a failure, creating metahumans all over again. In the episode "Grodd Lives", Thawne puts a device in the used-up particle accelerator, allowing him to go back to his time; however, he willingly allows himself to fight the Flash one more time.

Eureka (2006 TV series)
The most episodes of Eureka contain a reference to the particle accelerator.

In video games

Another World
In the 1991 video game Another World, the intro shows the player working with a particle accelerator. His laboratory is struck by lightning during an experiment, and the particle accelerator malfunctions - teleporting him to an alien world.

Scribblenauts
In the 2009 video game Scribblenauts, the Large Hadron Collider creates a black hole.

Xenoblade Chronicles
In both Xenoblade Chronicles and Xenoblade Chronicles 2, it is revealed to the player that the entire universe along with Earth was destroyed and recreated by Professor Klaus using a particle accelerator that orbits around the planet. This created two separate universes which the two games take place.

In table top and role playing games

Tales from the Loop
A huge underground particle accelerator known as the Loop is both a major plot point in, and a key element of the lore behind, this 2017 alternate history RPG table top game.

References

Particle accelerators
Science in popular culture